The forty-sixth edition of the Caribbean Series (Serie del Caribe) was held from February 1 through February 6 of  with the champion baseball teams of the Dominican Republic, Tigres del Licey; Mexico, Tomateros de Culiacán; Puerto Rico, Leones de Ponce, and Venezuela, Tigres de Aragua.  The format consisted of 12 games, each team facing the other teams twice, and the games were played at Estadio Quisqueya in Santo Domingo, Dominican Republic.

Summary

Final standings

Individual leaders

All-Star team

Sources
Bjarkman, Peter. Diamonds around the Globe: The Encyclopedia of International Baseball. Greenwood. 
2004 Caribbean Series All-Star team
Serie del Caribe : History, Records and Statistics (Spanish)

Caribbean
2004
International baseball competitions hosted by the Dominican Republic
2004 in Caribbean sport
2004 in Dominican Republic sport
February 2004 sports events in North America
21st century in Santo Domingo